ʻAbd al-Shakūr (ALA-LC romanization of ) is a male Muslim given name, built on the Arabic words ʻabd and al-Shakūr, one of the names of God in the Qur'an, which give rise to the Muslim theophoric names. It means "servant of the All-thankful".

Because the Arabic letter corresponding to sh is a sun letter, the letter l of the al- is assimilated to it. Thus although the name is written with letters corresponding to Abd al-Shakur, the usual pronunciation corresponds to Abd ash-Shakur. Alternative transliterations include Abdul Shakoor and others, all subject to variant spacing and hyphenation.

It may refer to:
ʽAbd al-Shakur ibn Yusuf, Emir of Harar, Ethiopia, until 1782
Muhammad ibn 'Ali 'Abd ash-Shakur, Emir of Harar, Ethiopia, until 1875
'Abd Allah II ibn 'Ali 'Abd ash-Shakur (died 1930), Emir of Harar, Ethiopia, until 1887
Abdul Shakoor Rashad (1921–2004), Afghan writer and scholar
Abdus Shakur (writer) (1941–2013), Bangladeshi litterateur and musicologist
Abdus Shakoor (painter) (born 1947), Bangladeshi painter
Mustafadden Abdush Shakur, known as Mustafa Shakur, (born 1984), American basketball player
Abdul Shakoor (cricketer) (born 1988), an Emirati cricketer
Abdusakur Tan, Filipino governor

References

Arabic masculine given names